Aşağı Tala is a village and municipality in the Zagatala District of Azerbaijan. It has a population of 6,027.

Notable natives 

 Sevil Gaziyeva — Hero of Socialist Labor.
Gurban Gurbanov - Azerbaijani football manager and former footballer.

References

External links

Populated places in Zaqatala District